Sorted is a six-part BBC television drama series that follows the personal and professional lives of several postmen. It was first broadcast in 2006 on BBC One and BBC HD. The series was created by Danny Brocklehurst, whose previous credits including Clocking Off, The Stretford Wives and Shameless. The series, set in Manchester but filmed in Stockport, and stars Neil Dudgeon, Will Mellor, Hugo Speer, Cal MacAninch and Dean Lennox Kelly.

The series achieved an average of four million viewers throughout its run, and was the only BBC drama series that year that achieved stronger ratings for its final episode than its first. Despite this – and the largely good critical response – the BBC announced in October 2006 that it would not recommission the programme. The name of the series has a double meaning – postal workers 'sort' mail for delivery and "sorted" is a common British slang word for accomplishment or good order.

Production
Producer Steve Lightfoot said of the series; "The warmth, wit and camaraderie of these very ordinary blokes ensures they can see each other through whatever life throws at them. It's very real, with powerful, emotional storylines which will hook viewers in to their world. The sorting office is where the boys come together at the start of every day. They're a tight knit group, but with their shift finishing in the afternoon, there's plenty of time to see what they get up to away from the Post Office. There are storylines which run through the series but each episode focuses in on one of the six."

Writer Danny Brocklehurst noted; "What this was supposed to be was very much in that Clocking Off or The Lakes kind of vein of telling stories about people who actually – other than in soaps – don't make it onto television that often.  It's about ordinary, working-class lives. I wanted to tell stories with dignity and humanity and truth about ordinary people, and even though the stories are not always life and death, they are really important to those characters. I think that there's not enough of that type of telly on these days. People want to sit down at the end of the day and watch something that they see a bit of themselves in."

"It's been really refreshing [to write a series starring predominantly male characters] because you can tap into that side of you that you understand – because obviously I am a man! I've never really written blokey blokes before in this kind of way. There are thousands of postmen in the UK – they're part of everyone's lives. I interviewed a lot of postmen just to try and get a flavour of the world and to try and really understand it and how it all works. I knew nothing about this before, even though I have an uncle who's a postman, but I got told some funny little stories about things that happened; one of which made it into the show – the battle of the radios in the first episode. That's from real life."

Cast
 Hugo Speer – Charlie King
 Neil Dudgeon – Harry Goodwin
 Cal MacAninch – Radge
 Dean Lennox Kelly – Dex
 Will Mellor – Barmpot
 Mark Womack – Jack
 Eva Pope – Kathy
 Nina Sosanya – Nancy
 Tracy-Ann Oberman – Amy
 Maria Doyle Kennedy – Roisin
 Josephine Butler – Abigail
 Mark Fountain – Aiden
 Julian Walsh – Hancock
 Katie Ross – Jess

Episodes

External links

References

2000s British drama television series
2006 British television series debuts
2006 British television series endings
BBC high definition shows
BBC television dramas
Television shows set in Manchester
2000s British television miniseries
English-language television shows
Television series by BBC Studios